Heriberto Urán (20 August 1954 – 1 January 2001) was a Colombian professional racing cyclist. He rode in the 1986 Tour de France.

References

External links
 

1954 births
2001 deaths
Colombian male cyclists
Sportspeople from Antioquia Department